The 1967 Mexican League season was the 43rd season in the history of the Mexican League. It was contested by eight teams. Charros de Jalisco won the championship by finishing the season first with a record of 85 wins and 55 losses, led by manager Guillermo Garibay.

Starting from this season, the Mexican League received Triple-A class from Minor League Baseball.

Standings

League leaders

Awards

References

Mexican League season
Mexican League season
Mexican League seasons